Larbi (Larbi ou le destin d'un grand footballeur) is a 2011 Moroccan film directed by Driss Mrini. The film was inspired by the life of football player Larbi Benbarek.

Synopsis 
The film chronicles the life of football player Larbi Benbarek.

Cast 

 Hanane Ibrahimi
 Fadila Benmoussa
 Bouchra Ahriche
 Abdelhak Belmjahed
 Mohamed Khashla
 Mouhsine Mouhtadi
 Marion Despouys
 Alexandre Ottovegio

References

External links 
 

2011 films
Moroccan drama films
Biographical films about sportspeople